The shadow ministry of John Pesutto is the incoming shadow cabinet of Victoria since 8 December 2022, serving in opposition to the government led by Daniel Andrews of the Australian Labor Party. The shadow ministry is the Opposition's alternative to the Third Andrews ministry, which was sworn in on 5 December 2022.

The shadow ministry was appointed by John Pesutto following his election as Leader of the Liberal Party and Leader of the Opposition on 8 December 2022.

The first arrangement of the shadow cabinet was announced on 18 December 2022, and Ryan Smith and previous party leader Matthew Guy were not included.

Shadow cabinet

References

Politics of Australia
Opposition of Australia
Victoria shadow ministries